Greatest Hits is a compilation album and primary Greatest Hits album by the American rock band Styx. It was released by A&M Records on August 22, 1995. It contains 16 tracks, 8 of which were Billboard Top 10 Pop Singles, another 4 that were Billboard Top 40 Pop Singles, and 4 that received heavy airplay on FM album oriented rock stations.

This album essentially replaced Styx's previous greatest hits album, Styx - Classics, Volume 15, which was released by A&M in 1987. That previous album had excluded the hit song "Lady" because the song was originally recorded for and released through Wooden Nickel Records (which also had a distribution arrangement with RCA Records). Because A&M/PolyGram had been unable to secure distribution rights to the song, most of the classic lineup of Styx (Dennis DeYoung, Tommy Shaw, Chuck Panozzo and James "J.Y." Young) reunited to re-record the track at Dennis' home studio, The White Room. They were joined by uncredited session drummer Todd Sucherman, who filled in for John Panozzo due to Panozzo's failing health; Sucherman joined the band permanently in 1996, during the Return to Paradise tour. The track, which is very similar to the original, was titled "Lady '95".

With the exception of "Lady '95", Styx - Greatest Hits features the original album versions of all the other songs included in the compilation. "Come Sail Away" is presented here in its full 6:05 version and "Miss America" is here in its original studio version (despite the CD's packaging showing incorrect time listings for both tracks).

Aftermath
The "Lady '95" session led to Styx reuniting.

Omitted Hits

While the Greatest Hits album arguably captured most of the biggest Styx pop and rock radio singles, there were some noticeable omissions, some which would appear on the follow up Styx Greatest Hits Part 2. Songs that charted in the top 40 that were not included on Volume 1 include "Love At First Sight (#25)", "Why Me" (#26), "Mademoiselle (#34)," "Music Time (#40)," and "Sing For The Day (#41)." The album also omitted Top Rock Tracks "Rockin' The Paradise (#8)," "Light Up," "Love Is the Ritual (#9), and "Snowblind" (#22)." Many of these songs found their way into Volume 2, but "Why Me,"  "Music Time," and "Love Is the Ritual" were not included in either version.

Track listing

Personnel 
 Dennis DeYoung - vocals, keyboards
 Tommy Shaw -  guitar, vocals
 James Young - guitar, vocals
 Chuck Panozzo - bass, vocals
 John Panozzo - drums
 John Curulewski - guitar on "Lorelei" and "Suite Madame Blue"
 Glen Burtnik - guitar on "Show Me the Way"
 Todd Sucherman - drums on "Lady '95" (uncredited)

References 

1995 greatest hits albums
Styx (band) compilation albums
A&M Records compilation albums